The Feilding and District Steam Rail Society, also known as Feilding Steam Rail, is a railway preservation society located in Feilding in the Manawatu region of New Zealand.  The society has restored or is restoring a number of locomotives and wagons once used on New Zealand's national rail network, with its star attraction being a WAB class tank locomotive, WAB 794.  The society also has X 442 and F 163.  Although nine members of the F class are preserved, this is the only one in mainline running condition.  The society also possesses two small diesel shunters, DSA 227 and TR 13, along with a large mainline diesel locomotive, DA 1401, and a varied collection of rolling stock including both passenger and freight wagons.

The society's depot includes the turntable from Palmerston, a town in north Otago in the South Island, as well as the Taonui station building that used to be located near Feilding on the North Island Main Trunk railway at the junction with the short-lived Taonui Branch.

Feilding Steam Rail operates excursions from its Feilding base to locations such as Wanganui, Ohakune, Dannevirke, and Pahiatua.  When severe rainfall and floods caused destructive slips in the Manawatu Gorge in 2004, the society operated sightseeing trains through the Gorge.

Locomotives, Railcars and Rolling Stock

Steam locomotives
 F 163, named "Ivanhoe" built by Dübs & Company, builder's number: 1542. Withdrawn from NZR in service , arrived at Feilding and District Steam Rail Society . Entered NZR in July 1881. In 1963 it was named Ivanhoe (formerly used by F 241). Withdrawn on 10 October 1964. It was placed into storage at Arthurs Pass until being used by the NZR for special services. In February 1979 it was leased to the AR&PS for display over a weekend. It was then restored to operation condition in the 1980s. During this time it was used in Wellington. It was purchased by the Rail Heritage Trust of New Zealand in 1993. In 2002 it was placed on lease to the F&DSRS.

External links
Official website of the Feilding and District Steam Rail Society

Heritage railways in New Zealand
Tourist attractions in Manawatū-Whanganui
Steam Rail Society